Calanoides acutus is a copepod found in Antarctica and the surrounding waters.

Description

Distribution

Ecology

Life history and reproduction
While C. acutus is only confirmed to breed from November to March, it likely starts breeding in early October, as a study observed females without eggs and late-stage nauplii presumably belonging to this copepod in mid-November. Older stages, on the other hand, are found in the top  during the summer, except during December, when they are found in the top . C. acutus starts to descend in February, although this is affected by the food supply, with individuals in the northern portion of the range, like in Drake Passage, only starting to winter during mid-March. There is no evidence of diel vertical migration in this species.

References

Calanoida
Fauna of the Southern Ocean
Crustaceans described in 1902